Alternative ribosome-rescue factor A (ArfA, YhdL) also known as peptidyl-tRNA hydrolase, is a protein that plays a role in rescuing of stalled ribosomes. It recruits RF2.

See also 
 ArfB - Alternative ribosome-rescue factor B

References 

Proteins